Benny Mardones is the fourth studio album from American singer Benny Mardones, which was released by Curb in 1989. Produced by Michael Lloyd, it was Mardones' first album since 1981's Too Much to Lose, following his battle with a drug addiction and other personal issues. The album was recorded and released after the successful re-issue of Mardones' 1980 hit song "Into the Night".

Background
In 1989, a Where Are They Now? Arizona radio segment spurred Los Angeles DJ Scott Shannon to add "Into the Night" to his playlist. The exposure ultimately rocketed the song back into the national charts, where it reached No. 20 in the first week of July 1989. The re-entry added 17 weeks to its previous run of 20, amounting to a total 37 (non consecutive) weeks, breaking the record set by Laura Branigan with her single "Gloria", which charted for 36 (consecutive) weeks from July 1982 to March 1983, for the longest-charting single of the 1980s by a solo artist.

The second wave of success of "Into the Night" resulted in Mardones signing with Curb Records. With his new deal came the return of Joel Diamond as Mardones' manager. He soon recorded a new studio album, which included a new version of "Into the Night". The self-titled album, or "the blue album" as referred by Mardones' fans, was released to little success as Curb was best known for being a country label and was not able to capitalize on the success of the "Into the Night".

For the album, Mardones mainly wrote tracks with Mark Mangold and Duane Evans. The album is the first where Mardones' son Michael Everett Mardones is listed as a backup singer. "How Could You Love Me" would later be re-recorded for Mardones' 1995 album Stand By Your Man and his 2002 album A Journey Through Time.

In a 1989 interview, Mardones was asked if he ever wondered about Curb's ability to market him on their country-orientated label:

Release
The album was originally released on CD and vinyl in America and Europe. To promote the album in Europe, Curb released the album's new version of "Into the Night" as a single. In North America, "I Never Really Loved You at All" and "I'll Be Good to You" were released as singles, with the former also being released as a promotional single in the UK.

Critical reception

Mike DeGagne of AllMusic praised Mardones' vocals on the album, describing them as "enchanting and smooth", but felt the material was "all meek love songs backed by hollow guitar and keyboards". He added that "all the ballads sound similar and could have been colored with some bulkier lyrics or even some tempo changes". DeGagne picked the re-recorded version of "Into the Night" as the album's strongest track and noted it has a "more seductive feel" than the 1980 original.

Track listing

Personnel 
 Benny Mardones - vocals, arranger
 Michael Lloyd - producer, arranger, drums, mixing, programming, synthesizer
 Joel Diamond - executive producer
 Duane Evans - guitar, keyboards, piano, arranger
 Mark Mangold - drums, keyboards, synthesizer, arranger
 Al Fritsch - guitar, backing vocals
 Ron Bloom, Michael Thompson - guitar
 Dave Amato - guitar, backing vocals
 Claude Gaudette - keyboards
 Bobby Martin - organ, Hammond organ, saxophone
 Dennis Belfield, John Pierce - bass
 Alex Acuña - Percussion
 Ron Krasinski, Jeff Porcaro - Drums
 Gary Falcone - backing vocals
 Hanspeter Huber - mixing
 Dan Nebenzal, Carmine Rubino - engineer, mixing
 John Valentino - assistant engineer
 Toby Wright - mixing assistant
 Debbie Lytton, Jeni Lytton - production coordination
 Marguerite Luciani - coordination
 Steve Hall - mastering
 Jeff Katz - photography

References

1989 albums
Benny Mardones albums
Curb Records albums